Victor John Perton (born 2 December 1958) is a former parliamentarian in the Australian state of Victoria, and formerly the Victorian Government's Commissioner to the Americas, based in San Francisco, USA.

Early life
Perton was raised in Melbourne and is the son of refugees from Latvia and Lithuania, part of the large Baltic migration to Australia from refugee camps in Northern Europe after the Second World War. Perton attended Catholic schools, of which St Joseph's Junior College was one, later studying economics and law at Monash University, Melbourne University and Peking University.

Political career
He was a member of the Victorian Legislative Assembly from 1988 to November 2006, representing the electorate of Doncaster for the Liberal Party.

Political aspirations
He joined the Liberal Party in 1976 and served on the State Executive as State President of the Young Liberal Movement and in various state and local constituency offices over the next decade. He graduated from university in 1982, and began practicing as a solicitor, as well as being a part-owner of a retail business. In 1984 Perton was called to the Bar and became a barrister at the Victorian Bar. The same year, Perton ran as the Liberal candidate against Bob Hawke in 1984 Federal Election for his seat of Wills. Perton subsequently gained admission to practice law in five states and in 1987 gained a Diploma of Chinese Law from Peking University in the People's Republic of China.

He remained active within the Liberal Party after graduating, serving on its state council and state policy assembly, and in 1988 stood as the Liberal candidate in the safe Liberal seat of Doncaster. He was easily elected. In Opposition, he became well known for his use of freedom of information legislation and Government Scrutiny. He was a member of the Liberal Party Investigatory Committee on Casino Policy in 1990 and became a critic of the introduction of gaming machines and casinos into Victoria. He was a Member of the Coalition Tricontinental Taskforce and served as Parliamentary Secretary to the Shadow Treasurer with special responsibility for manufacturing industry and economic development.

Kennett government
During the Kennett government, Perton was active in regulatory scrutiny, regulatory reform, technology policy and e-democracy.

Perton was the first Australian parliamentarian with a website and later the first to use an electronic town hall.

Perton served as the first chairman of the Scrutiny of Acts and Regulations Committee. His wide interpretation of the "rights" to be protected was criticised by some within the government, including committee member and rising backbencher Louise Asher, who produced a dissenting report. The then foreign minister, Gareth Evans, appointed Perton as an Australian delegate to the Second UN Conference on Human Rights.

From 1996 he served as chairman of the Law Reform Committee, the Multimedia Committee, the Data Protection Advisory Committee and the Electronic Business Framework Group.

During the Kennett government, there was media criticism that the government was reversing some of the transparency provisions introduced over the previous decades including the Freedom of Information and the Audit Act. Within the government, young MPs such as Steve Elder, Robert Doyle and Perton were seen as "small-l liberal" voices against controversial changes to the Auditor General's Act and the Freedom of Information Act.

Opposition
In 1999, after the defeat of the Kennett government, Perton became Shadow Minister for Conservation and Environment and Shadow Minister for Multimedia (later retitiled "Shadow Minister for Technology & Innovation." Perton performed well in these positions, and in August 2002, when Robert Doyle (Napthine's successor as leader) embarked on a major reshuffle in a last-ditch bid to boost the party's flagging fortunes before the state election due late that year, he was promoted to Shadow Attorney-General while also holding the positions of Shadow Minister for Consumer Affairs, Shadow Minister for Aboriginal Affairs and Shadow Minister for Technology and Innovation.

Doyle's attempt to prevent a landslide defeat failed, and the party suffered the worst loss in its history, with several Shadow Ministers losing their seats, and Perton coming very close to losing his own. In the aftermath of the defeat, Perton was promoted to Shadow Minister of Education. He regularly appeared in the media with vocal criticism of the government, and remained amongst the opposition's most high-profile members.

Within the spectrum of Liberal Party thought, Perton is regarded as a "small-l liberal", a position more common in the Victorian Liberal Party than the more aggressively right-wing New South Wales branch.

In February 2006, Perton announced that he would not contest the next election and relinquished his shadow ministry. Mary Wooldridge was elected as the Liberal Member for Doncaster at the 2006 State Election.

Reporting of the Estate Agents Guarantee Fund scandal
On 17 April 2002, Perton, as Opposition environment spokesman, raised concerns about Land Victoria and its Executive Director, Elizabeth O'Keeffe, regarding attempts to rort the Estate Agents Guarantee Fund.  Specifically, Perton reported that Land Victoria and the Department of Justice (DoJ) had "conspired to invent a 'survey reform' project to extract $7.5 million from the fund.  Land Victoria, a division of DNRE, under direction of O’Keeffe, and in collaboration with DoJ, was reported to have attempted to create "the survey project" to obtain extra government funding through EAGF, despite already having been funded. The administration of EAGF was under DoJ.

Perton reported that O’Keeffe's role in what became known as the EAGF scandal also involved successfully obtaining high level political approval for wrongful access to EAGF funds between October and December 2000.  This included "invention" of a $1.5 million "fraudulent survey project" as well as "other funds hidden away in smaller applications" totaling $7.5 million.  It was also reported that the survey project proposal was not revealed by O’Keeffe to the Surveyor-General of Victoria.  Perton reported that efforts by the Surveyor-General Keith Bell to raise his concerns about the attempts to obtain funds inappropriately from EAGF through his office resulted in the Surveyor-General being threatened and intimidated by O'Keeffe.

Perton, in April 2002 in Parliament and earlier in the media, quoted "from documents from 2001 in which the assistant director of land records and information services, Ivan Powell, talks of having 'invented some benefits' in regard to the project and of a request to 'invent another layer of detail'. Powell was a senior Land Registry official (under Land Victoria).  It was later reported that the Surveyor-General had earlier reported his concerns to the Auditor-General who stepped to prevent it from proceeding. The Surveyor-General also reported his concerns to the Ombudsman.

Perton reported to the Parliament that O’Keeffe was acting with the full support of the responsible Minister, Sherryl Garbutt.  Garbutt, the Minister for Conservation and Environment, to which Land Victoria was accountable.  Further, Perton reported that investigations by the Auditor-General and by Deloitte Touche Tohmatsu (Deloitte) were not willingly assisted by O’Keeffe and Land Victoria.   Requests for information and assistance by Deloitte's were blocked by Land Victoria.  Perton reported that on 31 May 2001, Deloitte requested information from Land Victoria.  In response, O’Keeffe's subordinate, John Hartigan, Director of the Land Registry (under Land Victoria) directed all staff to not comply with any request for information from Deloitte.

Perton reported that the Surveyor-General initially raised his concerns of the proposal to obtain funds from EAGF on 7 March 2001 with O'Keeffe.  The Surveyor-General's concerns were dismissed by O’Keeffe who "responded in threatening terms" that he was accountable to Garbutt and the Secretary through O’Keeffe and Hartigan.  The Secretary was Chloe Munro.

A subsequent investigation by the State Ombudsman, "A conspiracy between members of the Department of Natural Resources and Environment and of the Department of Justice to defraud the Estate Agents Guarantee Fund" found the attempt represented a conflict of interest and was not ethical. The Ombudsman reported that on 17 April 2002, during the Grievances Debate in the Legislative Assembly of the State Parliament, Perton raised allegations of a conspiracy to defraud the EAGF and that senior officers of the Department of Natural Resources and Environment (DNRE) and the Department of Justice (DoJ) were implicated in this matter.  The Ombudsman advised that subsequently two whistle-blowers had come forward to his office which led to his investigation in accordance with 'public interest disclosures' under section 50 the Whistle-blowers Protection Act 2001 and launched on 19 June 2002. The Ombudsman found that the "projectising" of the survey function was little more than a scheme to obtain additional funding, despite already being appropriated. It was reported by the Ombudsman that senior officers of DNRE attempted to cajole the Surveyor-General to take responsibility for the invented project, which he rightfully declined.  The Ombudsman concluded in his April 2003 Report: "Finally, the allegations that arose when this matter was placed under scrutiny ought to stand as a warning to those entrusted with determining the eligibility of applicants and/or programmes for funding from the various Statutory Trust Funds".
Perton also reported to the Parliament that this was not the first attempt by Land Victoria to illegally obtain funds from the EAGF.  The Auditor-General had prevented an earlier attempt by O’Keeffe-led Land Victoria and the Department of Justice to "raid the EAGF of $45 million".

Concerns of political interference in the performance of the surveyor-general
Perton frequently raised concerns regarding O’Keeffe's performance as the executive director of Land Victoria especially on matters of governance and accountability during the period 2001–02.  She was especially cited for her interference with, including threats and intimidation of, the Surveyor-General in the performance of his responsibilities. Such interference included: attempts to block or alter annual Surveyor-General reports; hiring of private investigators to investigate the Surveyor-General and his office; the contracting of the ASIBA lobbyist to discredit the Surveyor-General; and efforts to interfere with the Surveyor-General's review of State electoral boundaries in his capacity as an Electoral Boundaries Commissioner.  Over the period 2001–04, Perton and other members of the Opposition including David Davis and Ted Baillieu continued to raise concerns in the interference in the performance of the Surveyor-General's responsibilities at both senior department officials and the responsible Ministers. The Age, Herald Sun and the Australian Broadcasting Corporation carried numerous reports of such interference especially as it was frequently raised by the Opposition in both Houses of the Parliament of Victoria and reported in Hansard.  Such public reporting continued well after O’Keeffe departed Land Victoria in August 2002 and even after Bell resigned his appointment as Surveyor-General of Victoria in July 2003 and joined the World Bank.  Given the investigations and findings reported by key "watchdogs", including the Ombudsman and Auditor-General, as well as the reported advice of the Victorian Government Solicitor, Perton and his Opposition colleagues had rightly continued to raise concerns that may otherwise have not come to public attention.

After politics 
After Perton left politics he became an independent company director and practiced as a barrister. He remained active in supporting democracy movements in Asia.

In December 2008, Victorian premier John Brumby announced Perton's appointment as the Victorian government's commissioner to the americas, based in San Francisco.

His other appointments include to the Transport Accident Commission, the federal government's Council on Australia-Latin America Relations, the Global Integrity Summit and the Australian Centre for Financial Studies. He became a board member of Yarra Valley Water on 1 October 2015.

In 2015, Perton founded the Australian Leadership Project. Then, in 2019, he founded and became chief optimism officer of the Centre for Optimism.

References

External links
 Official website
 Liberal Party website
 Victorian Bar reference
 Regulatory Affairs website
 Perton's 1996 Human Rights website
 Discussion paper on the Operation of Section 85 of the Constitution Act 1975

1958 births
Living people
Monash Law School alumni
Liberal Party of Australia members of the Parliament of Victoria
University of Melbourne alumni
Members of the Victorian Legislative Assembly
21st-century Australian politicians
Australian people of Lithuanian descent
Australian people of Latvian descent
Politicians from Melbourne
People educated at St Joseph's College, Melbourne